The Tornado outbreak of November 1992, sometimes referred to as The Widespread Outbreak (as was the 1974 Super Outbreak initially), was a devastating, three-day outbreak of tornadoes that struck the Eastern and Midwestern United States on November 21–23. This exceptionally long-lived and geographically large outbreak produced 95 tornadoes over a 41-hour period, making it one of the longest-lasting and largest outbreaks ever recorded in the US, and published studies of the outbreak have indicated the possibility of even more tornadoes (92, 94, 146 and 143, with higher numbers reflected in NOAA studies). There were 26 fatalities, 641 injuries, and over $300 million in damage.

Meteorological synopsis
Rounding the base of this feature was an  jet streak. At the surface and in the lower levels of the atmosphere, low pressure was becoming established across western Texas. Strong wind flow in advance of these features led to the northward transport of warm, moist air from the Gulf of Mexico and into the Southern United States. The cold-core low progressed northeastward from western Texas toward the eastern Great Lakes region as the tornado outbreak unfolded. Areas of low pressure at and just above the surface followed similar tracks, with the associated low-level jet advancing across most of the Gulf Coast region and eventually along the Atlantic Coast. A preceding system had left a weak cold front stretching from Texas to Michigan on November 21, and in fact, forecasters initially questioned whether moisture would be sufficient for an organized severe weather event across Texas the following day. Convective available potential energy values, though modest, still reached 1,000 J/kg across southern Texas. This moist and unstable environment, combined with very strong wind shear, promoted the development of an intense squall line and isolated supercells ahead of it, contributing to multiple tornadoes in the Greater Houston area on the afternoon of November 21. As the squall line spread eastward the next day, an intense low-level jet contributed to provide favorable wind profiles, abundant moisture, and a sufficiently unstable airmass. As such, the line of thunderstorms maintained vigor as it moved eastward across the Gulf Coast, while discrete supercells continued to form to its east. The same general environment persisted into the Mid-Atlantic early on November 23. This severe weather setup contributed to dozens of tornadoes during that time, many of which were significant and deadly.

Farther north, a secondary concentration of tornadoes developed across the Ohio River Valley, resulting in the most damaging late-season tornado outbreak at the time there. Environmental conditions were more comparable to a widespread springtime event instead of a late season event.

Confirmed tornadoes

November 21 event

November 22 event

November 23 event

Hopewell–Florence–Pine Tree–Weir, Mississippi

This devastating, long-tracked, violent tornado began near Hopewell and moved northeast across Copiah and Simpson Counties, downing numerous trees as it moved toward the Jackson area. The tornado entered Rankin County and struck the south side of Florence as it moved through a mobile home park at that location. Several homes and mobile homes were destroyed in Florence, and two people were killed. The tornado exited Florence and struck another mobile home park, killing four more people. The tornado then tore directly through the Jackson suburb of Brandon, where numerous homes and 30 mobile homes were destroyed. Large and well-built brick homes were destroyed in the Easthaven Subdivision of Brandon, including a massive, well-constructed, brick mansion that was completely leveled, killing four people, one of whom was found  from the foundation. In Rankin County alone, a total of 60 homes were destroyed, over 500 homes were damaged. 10 people died in Rankin County, where the tornado attained its peak intensity. The tornado moved into Scott County, downing numerous trees and power lines. The tornado also damaged several homes in the town of Ludlow. The tornado then crossed into Leake County and struck the community of Pine Tree, where one person was killed in a mobile home. Three homes were destroyed and nine others were damaged in Leake County, and 26 chicken houses and several outbuildings were also destroyed. In neighboring Attala County, 36 homes were severely damaged or destroyed. The tornado then crossed into Choctaw County and struck Weir, where one person was killed in a mobile home. A total of 101 homes were damaged or destroyed in Choctaw County before the tornado dissipated. Extensive tree damage occurred along the entire path length—including thousands of uprooted trees—and 122 people were injured. Eight of the 12 deaths were in mobile homes.

See also
List of North American tornadoes and tornado outbreaks
1974 Super Outbreak
Tornado outbreak of November 17, 2013

Notes

References

Bibliography

External links
November 22, 1992 Tornado Outbreak (NWS Indianapolis)
Map of the November 1992 tornado outbreak Tornado History Project
November 22, 1992 North Carolina Tornado Outbreak (NWS Raleigh, North Carolina)
Cluster Tornado Outbreak in Houston, TX (Timothy P. Marshall, Storm Track.)

F4 tornadoes by date
 ,1992-11-22
Tornadoes of 1992
Tornadoes in Alabama
Tornadoes in Georgia (U.S. state)
Tornadoes in Indiana
Tornadoes in Kentucky
Tornadoes in Maryland
Tornadoes in Mississippi
Tornadoes in North Carolina
Tornadoes in Ohio
Tornadoes in South Carolina
Tornadoes in Tennessee
Tornadoes in Texas
Tornadoes in Virginia
1992 disasters in the United States
November 1992 events in the United States